EPA Larnaca (Enosis Pezoporikou Amol) was a Cypriot football club based in the city of Larnaca. Founded in 1930 with the merge of two local clubs, Pezoporikos and AMOL, the club was a founding member of Cyprus Football Association and participated in the first Cypriot Championship in 1934/35. Few years later, Pezoporikos was re-established. The golden era of the club was in the period 1944–1946, when the team won the Double in two consecutive seasons. In 1970, the club participated in the Greek First National Division, as Cyprus champions. They were also cup winners 5 times. In 1994, they merged with Pezoporikos Larnaca and formed AEK Larnaca FC.

The team had also basketball and volleyball sections. The women's volleyball team won the first Cyprus Championship in 1976.

Trophies

Football
Cypriot Championship:
Champions (3): 1944–45, 1945–46, 1969–70
Runners-up (5): 1938–39, 1946–47, 1949–50, 1951–52, 1971–72
Cypriot Cup:
Winners (5):1944–45, 1945–46, 1949–50, 1952–53, 1954–55
Runners-up (3): 1950–51, 1967–68, 1984–85
Pakkos Shield:
Winners (1): 1955
Runners-up (1): 1953
Cypriot Second Division:
Champions (1): 1989–90

Volleyball (women)
Cypriot Championship:
Champions (1): 1976
Cyprus Cup:
Runners-up (1): 1978

History in European competition

Overall

Matches

References

 
Association football clubs disestablished in 1994
Volleyball clubs in Cyprus
Defunct football clubs in Cyprus
Association football clubs established in 1930
Women's volleyball teams in Cyprus
1930 establishments in Cyprus
1994 disestablishments in Cyprus
Football clubs in Larnaca